Goran Puljko (born 7 December 1977) is a Croatian rowing cox. He competed in the men's coxed four event at the 1992 Summer Olympics.

References

1977 births
Living people
Croatian male rowers
Olympic rowers of Croatia
Rowers at the 1992 Summer Olympics
Sportspeople from Zagreb
Coxswains (rowing)